The Violin King is a 1923 German silent film directed by Karl Otto Krause.

Cast
In alphabetical order

References

External links

1923 films
Films of the Weimar Republic
Films directed by Karl Otto Krause
German silent feature films
German black-and-white films